Marian Danciu (born 24 April 2002), is a Romanian professional footballer who plays as forward for Liga I side Universitatea Craiova.

References

External links
 
 

2002 births
Living people
People from Târgu Cărbunești
Romanian footballers
Association football forwards
Liga I players
Liga III players
CS Universitatea Craiova players